Don't Stop the Carnival is a live album by jazz saxophonist Sonny Rollins, recorded at the Great American Music Hall and released on the Milestone label in 1978, featuring performances by Rollins with  Mark Soskin, Aurell Ray, Jerome Harris and Tony Williams with Donald Byrd joining on five tracks.

Reception

The Allmusic review by Scott Yanow wrote that the "versions of 'Don't Stop the Carnival' and 'Autumn Nocturne' are memorable but most of the rest of the set, although spirited, is a bit lightweight". Music critic Robert Christgau wrote "the meat of the album is sustaining if not exquisite, jazz food that anyone can digest."

Track listing
All compositions by Sonny Rollins except as indicated
 "Don't Stop the Carnival" (Traditional) – 8:46
 "Silver City" – 8:08
 "Autumn Nocturne" (Kim Gannon, Josef Myrow) – 6:36
 "Camel" – 4:14
 "Introducing the Performers" – 1:01
 "Nobody Else But Me" (Oscar Hammerstein II, Jerome Kern) – 6:57
 "Non-Cents" (Toney) – 9:25
 "A Child's Prayer" (Donald Byrd) – 8:05
 "President Hayes" (Byrd) – 9:49
 "Sais" (James Mtume) – 7:55
Recorded at the Great American Music Hall, San Francisco, CA, April 13, 14 & 15, 1978

Personnel
Sonny Rollins – tenor saxophone, soprano saxophone
Mark Soskin – piano, electric piano
Aurell Ray – electric guitar
Jerome Harris – electric bass
Tony Williams – drums
Donald Byrd – trumpet, flugelhorn (tracks 5-10)

References

Albums produced by Orrin Keepnews
1978 live albums
Sonny Rollins live albums
Milestone Records live albums
Albums recorded at the Great American Music Hall